Zulkifli Syukur (born 3 May 1984) is an Indonesian semi-professional footballer who plays as a full-back for Liga 3 club Adhyaksa Farmel.

Honours

Club
Arema Indonesia
 Indonesia Super League: 2009–10
Mitra Kukar
 General Sudirman Cup: 2015
PSM Makassar
 Piala Indonesia: 2019

International 
Indonesia
AFF Championship runner-up: 2010

References

External links
 
 

Living people
1984 births
Bugis people
Sportspeople from Makassar
Indonesian footballers
Indonesia international footballers
Persmin Minahasa players
Arema F.C. players
Persib Bandung players
Mitra Kukar players
Sriwijaya F.C. players
Indonesian Premier Division players
Liga 1 (Indonesia) players
Association football fullbacks
Footballers at the 2006 Asian Games
Asian Games competitors for Indonesia